Over the Rainbow is a charity album featuring show tunes recorded by various artists. It was released on 4 June 2007 by Universal Classics and Jazz. The album was conceived by Anneka Rice and produced by Tolga Kashif.

The making of Over the Rainbow was featured in a TV special of Challenge Anneka broadcast by ITV1 on 6 June 2007. £2 of every album sale went to the Association of Children's Hospices. The album launch included a concert held at the Chickenshed theatre featuring performances by children from hospices around the UK and artists featured on the album. The album peaked at no. 1 on the UK Compilation Chart.

Background 
Challenge Anneka is a British reality TV show in which presenter Anneka Rice is tasked with accomplishing a project, typically within a short time period, in aid of a charitable cause. The regular series aired between 1989 and 1995 on BBC1. The show was revived by ITV1 for two specials in 2006 and 2007. In March 2007, The Association of Children's Hospices challenged Rice to compile a studio album of newly recorded songs and hold a concert featuring live artists and a choir of children from various hospices around the UK. The album was put together in five days.

Recording 
Twelve of the thirteen tracks were recorded especially for the Over the Rainbow project. "New York, New York" by Michael Bolton is the only pre-existing recording, taken from his album Bolton Swings Sinatra: The Second Time Around (2006). McFly recorded their vocals for "You're the One That I Want" on the morning of 1 April 2007 within the Fleetwood Mobile studio in a hotel car park. All other tracks were recorded between 3 and 4 April 2007 at Air Studios.

Track listing

Charts

Personnel 
Credits adapted from liner notes.
 Tolga Kashif – production, keyboards, programming
 Royal Philharmonic Orchestra 
 The Rainbow Choir; Catherine Alexander, Nicko Anderson, Ceri & Bethany Astill, Kelly Atkinson, Jonathan Brook, Thomas Blumire, Lewis Cole, Fran Duff, Greg Fears, Charlie Marshall, Rhiannah Munday, Suzanna Ocansey, Sian Tolfree, Harvey Tye 
 Simon Hanhart – mixing
 Nick Wollage – orchestra engineer
 Tom Lewis – A&R
 Tony Dunne – artist coordinator
 Bekkie Sunley – product manager
 Peacock; Keith Peacock and Stuart Crouch – design and cover illustration
 Scott Wishart – photography

References

External links 
 The Association of Children's Hospices
 Challenge Anneka at itv.com

2007 compilation albums
Charity albums
Covers albums